The office of High Sheriff of South Glamorgan was established in 1974 as part of the creation of the county of South Glamorgan in Wales following the Local Government Act 1972, and, together with the High Sheriff of West Glamorgan and the High Sheriff of Mid Glamorgan, effectively replaced the office of the High Sheriff of Glamorgan.

High Sheriffs of South Glamorgan

Before 1974 – See High Sheriff of Glamorgan
1974: Colonel Kenneth Morgan  of Llantrithyd
1975: Anthony S. Martyn of St. Nicholas
1976: Joseph G. Gaskell of Dinas Powis
1977: Francis E. S. Hayes of Llansannor
1978: Cristopher M. Brain Of Peterson-Super-Ely
1979: The Rt. Hon. The Lord Leonard of Cardiff (Excused); Harold E. Williams, O.B.E. of Penarth
1980: Thomas Henry Keen, of Bonvilston (Excused); Henry Gethin Lewis of Sutton Mawr
1981: Colonel Sir Christopher Peterson of Cardiff
1982: Ivan Dale Owen of Penarth
1983: Ian Eric Colston of Boverton, Llantwit Major
1984: Cecil H. Rapport of Cardiff
1985: W. Emrys Evans of Dinas Powis
1986: Sir Brooke Charles Boothby, 15th Baronet, of Ffonmon
1987: Sir Donald Walters  of Cardiff
1988: Dudley H. Fisher of Cardiff
1989: Christopher Pollard of Penarth
1990: Brian K. Thomas of Cardiff
1991: Michael J. Clay D.L. of Cowbridge
1992: Alastair O. Golley, of Dinas Powis
1993: Commander John M.D. Curteis  of St. Hilary
1994: Mrs. Joanna Cory of Penllyn
1995: J. Wynford Evans of St. Fagans
1996: Ralph Philip Vincent Rees of Radyr
1997: John Phillips of Ystradowen
1998: David M. Jones, of Cowbridge
1999: Mrs. Meriel Watkins of Penarth
2000: Michael Charles Eddershaw of Llansannor
2001: Lieutenant Colonel Rhodri Llewellyn Traherne of Coedarhydyglyn 
2002: Colin J. Richards of St. Nicholas 
2003: Mrs. Josephine Homfray of Cowbridge
2004: Mrs. Fiona Natalie Peel of Cardiff
2005: Derek Ivor Rapport of Cardiff 
2006: Lady Monjulee Webb 
2007: Paul Williams 
2008: Brian Idris Rees of Llandaff 
2009: Professor Anthony J Hazell of Penarth  
2010: Mrs Margaret Anne Campbell  
2011: Roger G Thomas  
2012: Arun Midha
2013: Mrs M A Meredith 
2014: David Ward Jenkins 
2015: Professor Heather Vivienne Stevens of The Waterloo Foundation, Cardiff
2016: Professor John Williams of Cardiff
2017: Gilbert C Lloyd  
2018: Brian Charles Lakin of Walterston, near Barry
2019: Dr Isabel Mary Graham, Peterston-super-Ely, Cardiff  
2020: Andrew Rhys Howell of St Mellons, Cardiff 
2021: Peter Richard Dewey of St Nicholas Vale of Glamorgan
2022: Mrs Rosaleen Moriarty-Simmonds, OBE
2023: David Rhys Hughes James

References
Former High Sheriffs of South Glamorgan

 
South Glamorgan
South Glamorgan